Thalidomide!! A Musical is a British musical written and composed by Mat Fraser, who was born with phocomelia as a result of the drug thalidomide being taken during his mother's pregnancy. Fraser and Anna Winslet play all the roles in the show.

The musical was developed with director Bill Bankes-Jones and premiered at the (London) Battersea Arts Centre's Octoberfest in 2005. It has since played across Britain and at festivals in Cardiff and Versailles, France.

The production tells the story of a love affair between Glyn, a thalidomide survivor (Fraser) and a non-disabled woman, Katie Crawford (Winslet), attracted by his phocomelia. Fraser calls the story a "cartoon version" of his own life. Winslet won the role in part because she did not shirk at an audition request to mimic Fraser himself.

Musical numbers
 "Monster Babies"
 "I'll Be His Arms"
 "It's Hard to Hitch Down Life's Highway with No Thumbs"
 "Talk to the Flipper ('Cause the Face Don't Care)"

Reception
The Daily Telegraph summarized the show as "sharp and original, but not for the squeamish".
One Wolverhampton councillor, Malcolm Gwinnett, criticised the show, arguing that, "To exploit people in this way is, frankly, sick", while Fraser said that, "It makes Jerry Springer look tame".

See also
 NoBody's Perfect, a 2009 documentary film

References

2005 musicals
British plays
Plays and musicals about disability
Amputees in fiction
Phocomelia